A Bid for Fortune is a 1917 British silent crime film directed by Sidney Morgan and starring A. Harding Steerman, Violet Graham and Sydney Vautier.

Cast
 A. Harding Steerman as Dr Nikola
 Violet Graham as Phyllis Wetherall
 Sydney Vautier as Dick Hattaras

References

Bibliography
 Goble, Alan. The Complete Index to Literary Sources in Film. Walter de Gruyter, 1999.
 Low, Rachael. The History of the British Film 1914 - 1918. George Allen & Unwin, 1950.

External links
 

1917 films
British crime films
British silent feature films
Films directed by Sidney Morgan
1917 crime films
British black-and-white films
1910s English-language films
1910s British films